Starksia y-lineata, the forked bar blenny, is a species of labrisomid blenny native to reef environments of the Caribbean Sea.  This species can reach a length of  SL.

References

y-lineata
Fish described in 1965
Fish of the Caribbean